Halik may refer to
Halik (name)
Halik Sa Apoy (Fiery Kiss), a 1998 Philippine drama series
Halik sa Hangin (Kiss in the Wind), a 2015 Filipino film
Halik (TV series) (Kiss of Betrayal), a 2018 Philippine drama series